Nalin Kumar Niranjan Shetty Kateel (born 7 December 1966) is an Indian politician who is the current and 9th State President of Bharatiya Janata Party of Karnataka since from 20 August 2019 and Member of Parliament from Dakshina Kannada constituency since from 2009.

Political career
Nalin Kumar Kateel  started his social and political life when he became a Prachark (full-time member) of Rashtriya Swayam Sevak Sangh (RSS), a Hindu Nationalist organisation at the age of 18 for a period of 12 years. After his father's death, he took over the responsibility of managing his family affairs, agriculture, and also started his professional career as a civil contractor. Later he joined the Bharatiya Janta Party and rising through the ranks became District general secretary of the party in the year 2004, the office of which he still holds. In the year 2009 he was elected to the Lok Sabha, the lower house of India's Parliament the Sansad. He was re-elected as MP in the 2014 elections for the second term.

On 20 August 2019, he was appointed the state unit president of the Karnataka BJP to replace B. S. Yediyurappa who had become the chief minister.

As Member of Parliament Nalin Kumar Kateel has Participated in 45 Debate and raised 687 questions.

Controversies
 On 14 February 2023, he said that Tipu Sultan supporters should leave the state, and also said that Ram and Hanuman worshippers should live in the state. Earlier, he asked people to focus on alleged Love Jihad rather than on roads and infrastructure.
 On 5 August 2019, a Bengaluru court issued an arrest warrant against him for an inflammatory speech.  On June 3, 2017, Kateel had made a provocative speech in a protest held in front of Konaje police (under Mangaluru city police) station.
On May 14, 2014 Sathish Shetty, a resident of Beverly Park, Thane logged an FIR against Nalin Kumar accusing him of having “an illicit relationship with his wife Vinutha. Nalin Kumar Kateel denied the allegations saying it is a political conspiracy to damage his image politically. A FIR was registered in Mangalore City police station.
BJP Yuva Morcha expressed anger towards the inefficiency of the MP towards development work and also towards inaction of the police investigation in the death of the Yuva morcha leader and gheraoed and pushed his car almost endangering his life. However, his team later floated that there is a conspiracy to malign his image hence the anger of BJP workers was purposely created, they said in a media briefing.

Position held

References

The Hindu,Nalin Kumar Kateel Humbles Poojary 17 May 2009
IBN Live,Nalin Kumar Kateel Statistics
Newskarnataka.com   18 June 2015

External links

India MPs 2009–2014
Mangaloreans
People from Dakshina Kannada district
1966 births
Living people
Lok Sabha members from Karnataka
India MPs 2014–2019
Bharatiya Janata Party politicians from Karnataka
India MPs 2019–present